Bifunctional coenzyme A synthase is an enzyme that in mammals is encoded by the COASY gene that catalyses the synthesis of coenzyme A from 4'-phosphopantetheine.

Function 
COASY is an enzyme that catalyzes the last two steps in the synthesis of coenzyme A from vitamin B5 (pantothenic acid). The primary substrate is 4'-phosphopantetheine and COASY is a bifunctional enzyme in this pathway:
 4′-Phosphopantetheine is adenylated to form dephospho-CoA by the enzyme phosphopantetheine adenylyl-transferase (PPAT; CoaD)
 Next, dephospho-CoA is phosphorylated to coenzyme A by the enzyme dephospho-CoA kinase (DPCK; CoaE)
In mammals this is a single enzyme, but in organisms including yeast and bacteria these enzymes are encoded by separate genes.

Interactions 
COASY has been shown to interact with P70-S6 Kinase 1.
In 2009, COASY has also been implicated in PI3K signaling, as it was shown to interact with a regulatory subunit of PI3K.

Clinical significance 
Loss of function mutations to COASY have been associated with an ultra-rare disease that causes neurodegeneration with brain iron accumulation called COASY protein-associated neurodegeneration (CoPAN), or NBIA6.

References

External links

Further reading